Charles-Amédée Kohler (born Charles-Gottlieb Kohler; 15 June 1790 – 15 September 1874) was a Swiss chocolatier and entrepreneur who founded Chocolat Kohler. He notably invented hazelnut chocolate, in his factory opened in 1830 in Lausanne. After his death the Kohler company continued in the Swiss chocolate industry. It merged in 1904 with the Peter and in 1911 with the Cailler chocolate brands; before being finally purchased by Nestlé in 1929.

Biography
Kohler was born on 15 June 1790 in Lausanne, to Gottlieb (later known by the gallicized version of his name, Amédée) Kohler, a merchant of colonial goods and wine from Büren an der Aare, and Anne Ernst. While still young he joined his father's business that operated in the city since 1793, and in 1817 formed a partnership with his brother, Frédéric, and father to form the wholesale firm Amédée Kohler et Fils (Amédée Kohler & Sons).

In 1830 he bought a mill in downtown Lausanne and established a chocolate factory, where he eventually created the recipe for chocolate mixed with hazelnut. After his father's death in 1833, Kohler became fully dedicated to the chocolate making business, and Frédéric left the firm the following year. In 1849 he acquired a sawmill in Sauvabelin, a neighbourhood in the suburbs of Lausanne, which he converted into a factory and to where he transferred the production.

In 1865, Kohler retired from the company and passed the administration to his sons Charles-Amédée and Adolphe. He died in Lausanne on 15 September 1874.

Notes

References

External links
Finedarkchocolate.com

Swiss chocolatiers
1790 births
1874 deaths
19th-century Swiss inventors
People from Lausanne
Swiss industrialists
Swiss company founders
19th-century Swiss businesspeople